Bertha Johanne Feiring Maass Tapper (25 January 1859 - 2 September 1915) was a Norwegian composer, pianist, and teacher, best known for editing the piano works of Edvard Grieg for publication in America. She published under the name Bertha Feiring Tapper.

Biography
Tapper was one of nine children born in Oslo, Norway to Berthe Iversdatter and Lars Olsen Feiring. She married Carl Ludvig Otto Maass and they had a son (Louis) and a daughter (Klea). She later married musicologist Thomas Tapper in New York in 1894.

She studied music with Johan Svendsen and Agatha Backer Grondahl in Norway. In 1878, she graduated from the Conservatory of Music in Leipzig, Germany (today the University of Music and Theatre), and later studied with Theodor Leschetizkey  in Vienna. 

She emigrated to America in 1881. She taught and performed, both as a piano soloist and as an accompanist with the Kneisel Quartet and other musicians. She taught piano at the New England Conservatory from 1889 to 1897, and at the Institute of Musical Art (which became the Juilliard School) from 1905 to 1910. Her students included Abram Chasins, Lev Ornstein, and Kay Swift. She often hosted her students at her summer home in Blue Hill, Maine. 

Although she is sometimes described as a composer, Tapper is best known for her editions of Grieg’s piano works published by Oliver Ditson. Ditson’s ad in a 1910 Boston Symphony program for Grieg’s Piano Lyrics and Shorter Compositions edited by Tapper noted that “The editor is in sympathy with the composer's genius and has performed her task with care for details and insight into the characteristic idiom which makes Grieg's music almost synonymous with Norwegian composition.”

Works
Tapper contributed an article, “Mastering Piano Problems,” to the book Piano Mastery by Harriette Brower (Oliver Ditson 1911). She edited at least one piano piece by Emil Sjogren, The Far Country, opus 41. Her editions of Grieg’s piano works, all published by Ditson, include:

Concerto in a minor for piano and orchestra, opus 16
Eight Lyric Pieces, opus 12
Eight Lyric Pieces, opus 38
From Holberg’s Time, opus 40
Larger Piano Compositions
Peer Gynt Suite, opus 46
Piano Lyrics and Shorter Compositions
Puck, opus 71
Six Lyric Pieces, opus 43
Sketches of Norwegian Life, opus 19
Sonata in e minor, opus 7

References 

Norwegian women composers
1859 births
1915 deaths
Women pianists
Norwegian pianists
Norwegian women editors
Norwegian editors